Albano Olivetti (born 24 November 1991) is a French professional tennis player. Olivetti is a doubles specialist and has a career-high ATP doubles ranking of No. 66 achieved on 14 November 2022.

Although not officially recognised by the ATP, Olivetti did hit the second fastest serve on record at 160 mph or 257.5 km/h during the first round of the 2012 Internazionali Trofeo Lame Perrel–Faip.

Career

2012: ATP singles debut
Albano qualified for the main draw of an ATP event for the first time in his career in Marseille, coming through qualifying and shocking World No. 8 Mardy Fish on his way to reaching the quarterfinals, where he lost to Michaël Llodra in two close sets.

2021–2022: Maiden ATP final, Top 100 debut in doubles 
He reached the top 100 at World No. 97 on 25 April 2022.

2023: Second doubles final
At the 2023 Open Sud de France he reached his second final in doubles partnering American Maxime Cressy as a wildcard pair defeating second seeded pair of Santiago González / Édouard Roger-Vasselin and Sander Arends / David Pel en route.

ATP career finals

Doubles: 2 (2 runner-ups)

Challenger and Futures finals

Singles: 18 (6–12)

Doubles:72 (49–23)

References

External links

 
 
 

French male tennis players
Living people
1991 births
French people of Italian descent
People from Haguenau
Sportspeople from Bas-Rhin
21st-century French people